Xavier Artigas Lopez (born 27 May 2003) is a Spanish motorcycle racer, riding for CF Moto Prüstel in the Moto3 World Championship.

Career

Early career

2018
Artigas bought attention to himself in the 2018 Red Bull MotoGP Rookies Cup, where he won a race, came in second place three times, and finished third once. He finished third in the standings, behind Turkish twins Can Öncü and Deniz Öncü.

2019
Artigas moved up to the Moto3 Junior World Championship for the 2019 season, and ended with one race win, one second place, and two third place podium finishes, once again finishing third in the standings. He made a wildcard appearance in the final race of Moto3 in 2019 and managed to score an impressive podium, finishing third in Valencia.

2020
Artigas stayed in the Junior World Championship for the 2020 season, and improved massively. Out of the 11 races held that year, he finished on the top two steps of the podium in eight races (winning two, and runner up six times), ending the season second in the standings, and earning himself a seat with Leopard Racing for the 2021 Moto3 World Championship.

Moto3 World Championship

2021
Artigas' 2021 Moto3 season as a rookie was disappointing. The year began with three straight retirements, while his teammate Dennis Foggia was regularly at the front, scoring a podium in the third race. Artigas improved over the year, collecting regular point finishes, and in the last race of the season at Valencia, following Dennis Foggia and Pedro Acosta making contact on the last lap, Artigas was able to win the race. He finished the season with 72 points, 15th in the standings, and was not extended by Leopard Racing.

Prüstel GP (2022-present)
For 2022, Artigas is contracted to ride for Prüstel GP, next to Carlos Tatay.

Career statistics

Red Bull MotoGP Rookies Cup

Races by year
(key) (Races in bold indicate pole position, races in italics indicate fastest lap)

FIM CEV Moto3 Junior World Championship

Races by year
(key) (Races in bold indicate pole position, races in italics indicate fastest lap)

Grand Prix motorcycle racing

By season

By class

Races by year
(key) (Races in bold indicate pole position, races in italics indicate fastest lap)

References

External links

Spanish motorcycle racers
Motorcycle racers from Catalonia
2003 births
Living people
Moto3 World Championship riders
Sportspeople from Barcelona